Straumsfjorden or Straumfjorden may refer to the following places in Norway:

Straumsfjorden

Straumsfjorden, Agder, a lake in Bygland and Valle municipalities in Agder county
Straumsfjorden, Troms og Finnland, a strait in Tromsø and Balsfjord municipalities in Troms og Finnland county
Straumsfjorden, Trøndelag, a fjord in Hitra municipality in Trøndelag county
Straumsfjorden, Vestland, a fjord in Solund municipality in Vestland county

Straumfjorden

Straumfjorden, Nordland, a fjord in Bø municipality in Nordland county
Straumfjorden, Sortland, a fjord arm off the Eidsfjorden in Sortland municipality in Nordland county
Straumfjorden, Steigen, a fjord arm off the Sagfjorden in Steigen municipality in Nordland county
Straumfjorden, Troms og Finnmark, a fjord arm off the Reisafjorden in Nordreisa municipality in Troms og Finnmark county

Vinland
Straumfjörð, Straumsfjord or Straumfjord, a fjord in Vinland according to the Saga of Erik the Red

See also
Straumfjordvatnet, a lake with a similar name